Tuulkhangai Tuguldur (born June 17, 1985) is a Mongolian cyclist, who last rode for UCI Continental team .

Major results
Source: 

2007
 National Road Championships
2nd Road race
2nd Time trial
2008
 National Road Championships
1st  Time trial
3rd Road race
2009
 1st Overall Tour of Mongolia
1st Stages 1, 4, 5 & 6
 2nd Time trial, National Road Championships
 5th Road race, East Asian Games
2010
 National Road Championships
1st  Road race
1st  Time trial
 5th Overall Tour of Thailand
2011
 National Road Championships
2nd Road race
3rd Time trial
2012
 5th Time trial, Asian Road Championships
2013
 1st Stage 2 Tour of Poyang Lake
 3rd  Road race, East Asian Games
 Asian Road Championships
6th Time trial
7th Road race
2014
 National Road Championships
1st  Time trial
3rd Road race
 Asian Road Championships
4th Time trial
7th Road race
2015
 National Road Championships
1st  Time trial
3rd Road race
 6th Time trial, Asian Road Championships
2016
 National Road Championships
2nd Road race
2nd Time trial
2018
 3rd Time trial, National Road Championships
 Asian Road Championships
4th Team time trial
8th Road race
2019
 3rd Time trial, National Road Championships
 4th Team time trial, Asian Road Championships

References

External links

1985 births
Living people
Mongolian male cyclists
Cyclists at the 2006 Asian Games
Cyclists at the 2010 Asian Games
Cyclists at the 2014 Asian Games
Cyclists at the 2018 Asian Games
Asian Games competitors for Mongolia
21st-century Mongolian people